Molly-Mae Hague (born 26 May 1999) is an English social media influencer who was a runner-up in the fifth series of reality dating show Love Island. She has been the creative director of PrettyLittleThing since 2021.

Early life 
Hague was born in Stevenage and grew up in Hitchin, Hertfordshire. Her parents were both police officers. She has one sister. She attended The Priory School, Hitchin. As a teenager, Hague participated in beauty pageants, being crowned Miss Teen Hertfordshire in 2015 and World Teen Supermodel UK in 2016, going on to be awarded first runner-up at the international competition.

Career 
In 2019, Hague entered the fifth series of Love Island on Day 4. She coupled up with Tommy Fury and the pair made it to the final, finishing in second place. She also appeared on a spin-off starring Fury and Curtis Pritchard called The Boxer & The Ballroom Dancer and made an appearance in an episode of Tyson Fury: Gypsy King. She later revealed the reason for going on the show was to "enhance her career". Hague's Instagram following reportedly grew from 160,000 to almost three million during her time in the Love Island villa. 

After leaving Love Island, Hague reportedly signed a £500,000 deal with PrettyLittleThing and in August 2021 was hired as the firm's "creative director" after previously serving as a brand ambassador.  Hague has also launched a self tanning range and had sponsorship deals with Starbucks.

Controversies
In March 2021, she was reprimanded for running an £8,000 online prize draw on Instagram that failed to follow the advertising regulations for such competitions. The Advertising Standards Authority ruled she had been unable to provide evidence the winners had been randomly and fairly picked.

On 13 December 2021, Hague appeared as a guest on Steven Bartlett's The Diary of a CEO podcast which was uploaded to YouTube. In the interview, she made comments on poverty and wealth inequality, which were the source of controversy, being accused of being "tone deaf" and dubbed "Thatcherite" comments. Hague suggested that those less fortunate than herself in their upbringing only had themselves to blame for their lack of financial stability, stating that "we all have the same 24 hours in a day". These remarks sparked outrage nation-wide and led to calls for her resignation as PrettyLittleThing's creative director.

In July 2022, an Instagram post by her was banned due to being an advert with that intent omitted.

Personal life 
Hague is in a relationship with professional boxer Tommy Fury, whom she met on Love Island. They live together in Cheshire. In September 2022, the couple announced that they were expecting their first child. She gave birth to a daughter on 23 January 2023.

References 

Living people
Social media influencers
1999 births
People from Hitchin
20th-century English women
21st-century English women
English marketing people
20th-century English businesspeople
21st-century English businesspeople
20th-century English businesswomen
21st-century English businesswomen
Love Island (2015 TV series) contestants